The Kursaal is a Grade II listed building in Southend-on-Sea, Essex, England, which opened in 1901 as part of one of the world's first purpose-built amusement parks. The venue is noted for the main building with distinctive dome, designed by George Campbell Sherrin, which featured on a Royal Mail special stamp in 2011.

History

Founding as Marine Park (1894) 
The Kursaal site was opened in 1894 by father and son Alfred and Bernard Wiltshire Tollhurst on four acres of land purchased the previous year, as the 'Marine Park and Gardens'. In July 1901 they opened a grand entrance pavilion, the Kursaal Palace, designed by George Sherrin and John Clarke, containing a circus, ballroom, arcade, dining hall and billiard room. The word Kursaal is German (literally meaning "cure hall") and refers to the main banquet hall of a spa town. Southend's Kursaal became the largest fairground in the south of England.

Luna Park (1910) 
The owner of the park, Kursaal Ltd, was liquidated following financial crises but the park continued to run. Eventually in 1910 the Kursaal was bought by Luna Park and Palace of Amusements (Southend) Ltd, which had been registered on 14 March 1910 by William Hilton. The park was renamed accordingly to Luna Park, and Hilton became the managing director of the park. Hilton opened a large list of attractions, including the Harton Scenic Railway and Figure of Eight roller coasters, a miniature railway, Astley's circus and a cinema.

Luna Park was claiming 100,000 visitors per week; however, a June 1911 fire destroyed two of the park's most notable attractions, the Joy Wheel and the Figure of Eight Railway Coaster. By 1912 trustees had taken over Hilton's company, and the Luna Park Company was dissolved in 1915.

Ownership by the Morehouses (1915) 
In 1915 American industrialist Clifton Jay Morehouse became the new owner of the park. Morehouse had arrived in London in 1897, settling in Birmingham later. He reinstated the park's original title of the 'Kursaal' and converted the circus into a ballroom and ice rink. He led the park to become one of the most successful in England at the time, establishing local sporting events and trade exhibitions. In 1916 a zoo housing bears, tigers and wolves was opened at the 4-acre (1.6-ha) site, however it was closed following the start of World War II.

Morehouse suddenly died in March 1920. His son David de Forrest Morehouse took over directorship.

In 1929, 11 people were seriously injured on the Flying Boat ride. In 1934 David de Forrest Morehouse died and a board of trustees took over the Kursaal. The Kursaal was closed to the public during World War II.

Greyhound racing (1927–1929)

In 1927 two Scotsmen named Jimmy Shand and Tom Wilson approached Southend United F.C., who played at the Kursaal, and agreed a deal to start greyhound racing on 27 July. The first meeting attracted 5,000 spectators and the first race was won by a greyhound called Self Starter at odds of 2–1 over 500 yards. The meeting was opened by the Deputy Mayor Alderman H A Dowsett and fifty track bookmakers attended. The racing was independent (not affiliated to the sports governing body the National Greyhound Racing Club).

John Bilsland then added his name to the venture, but it only operated for two years before the entire enterprise (including greyhounds) was moved by train to the Stanley Stadium in Liverpool, owing to increased rent demands. The football club remained there until 1934, when they moved to Southend Stadium.

Post-war period (1948) 
In 1948 C. J. Morehouse II took over the Kursaal from the trustees. The ballroom of the Kursaal had hosted all manner of musical artistes following its opening in 1901. During the 1970s it made its name as Southend's preeminent rock music venue, showcasing internationally successful acts such as Black Sabbath, Deep Purple, Thin Lizzy, Queen and AC/DC. A photograph of the latter performing at The Kursaal in 1977 was used on the front cover of their Let There Be Rock album.

Decline and closure (1973–1986) 
The Kursaal as a whole had been in gradual decline since the early 1970s, with the outdoor amusements closing in 1973. At the end of 1977 the decision was made to close the ballroom, with the main building finally succumbing in 1986. The outdoor amusement area was later redeveloped for housing.

Main building reopening (1998) 
After a multimillion-pound redevelopment by the Rowallan Group, the main Kursaal building was reopened in 1998 with a bowling alley, a casino and other amusements. The building originally contained a McDonald's, but the fast food chain left in 2008.

The bowling alley closed permanently in 2019, and the casino closed permanently in 2020. This currently leaves only a Tesco Express store occupying part of this historic building.

List of rides and attractions

The Skids/Swirls
Bumper Cars
The Morehouse Galloper (1954–1973)
Ski Jump
Waltzer
ROTOR (1960s)
Wild Mouse (1960s)
Calypso (1962–1983?)
Harton Scenic Railway (1910–1973)
Switchback Railway
1st Water Chute (1921–1957)
2nd Water Chute (1958–1971)
Toboggan Slide (1925–present) previously Ice Toboggan
The Mont Blanc (1933–1973)
Laff In The Dark (1938–1973)
Aerial Flight (1894–1973)
Figure of Eight Coaster (1910–1947)
Arctic River Caves, a "£10,000 superstructure from Earl's Court"
Joy Wheel, introduced by new owners the Luna Park Company ( 1910)
Bowl Slide
Airsport (?–1973)
Miniature Railway
The Whip (1921–?)
The Tumblers (1921–?)
Never Stop Railway (1923–?)
Autodrome (1927–?)
Wall Of Death (1929–?)
Midget Mansion (1930–?)
Caterpillar
Jolly Tubes (1920s–?)
Whirlpool (<1950s–1973)
Dive Bomber (1950s–1959)
Noahs Ark (1953–?)
Ghost Train (1931–?)
Petboats (1933–?)
Mountain Dipper (1933–?)
The Whirlwind Racer (1930s–?)
Tumblebug (1938–?)
Seaplane (1938–?)
Stratosphere or Stratosphere Rocket (1945–?)
The Under & Over (?–1973)
Knock the lady out of bed
Kelly's house or Kelly's cottage (destroyed by fire)

See also
The Kursaal Flyers, pop band, formed in Southend in 1973

References

External links
http://kursaal.kick-butt.co.uk/

1901 establishments in England
Amusement parks in England
Buildings and structures in Southend-on-Sea
Tourist attractions in Essex
Defunct greyhound racing venues in the United Kingdom
Defunct sports venues in Essex
Southend United F.C.
Defunct football venues in England
Event venues established in 1901
English Football League venues
Grade II listed buildings in Essex